Scotura bugabensis is a moth of the family Notodontidae first described by Druce in 1895. It is found from Costa Rica south to south-eastern Peru at elevations between 0 and 600 meters

References

Moths described in 1895
Notodontidae of South America